Ken Bevel is a former American Marine Corps officer, pastor and actor who co-starred in the 2008 film Fireproof and the 2011 film Courageous. In Fireproof, Bevel portrays firefighter Michael Simmons, and portrays police officer Nathan Hayes in Courageous.

Filmography 
 Fireproof (2008) - Michael Simmons
 Courageous (2011) - Nathan Hayes

References

External links 
 
 Black History program held at Lee school at WALB
 Sherwood Baptist Church

Male actors from Georgia (U.S. state)
Living people
1968 births